Basic Training (a.k.a. Up the Military) is a 1985 sex comedy film by Andrew Sugerman.  It is often considered to be one of the worst films of 1985. While set in Washington D.C., most of the production was filmed in Los Angeles, including Bob Hope Patriotic Hall. During production the working title was "Up the Pentagon."

Plot
The film follows Melinda, a female employee of the Pentagon's public information service, who loses her job when she refuses to give in to her male superiors' sexual advances. She then becomes outraged by the Pentagon's "un-patriotic" actions, and takes revenge on them by using her physical charms to seduce the top brass into letting her back into the Pentagon. After being re-employed, she sets out to manipulate them to her will and destroy their careers, thus ridding the US government of what she sees as "perverts", who care more about cheap thrills than national security. She eventually seduces the Russian ambassador into betraying valuable military secrets by offering him among other things "the most scrumptious little breasts" as well as something (left unsaid) which she declares to be the "softest, moistest, sweetest". In the end she is appointed Secretary of Defense as a reward.

Cast
Ann Dusenberry - Melinda
Rhonda Shear - Debbie
Angela Aames - Cheryl
Will Nye - Lt. Cranston
Walter Gotell - Nabokov
Marty Brill - General Strombs
William A. Forester - General Kane

DVD release
MGM released a pan and scan DVD in 2003.

External links
 
 

1985 films
1980s sex comedy films
American sex comedy films
Playboy Productions films
Teen sex comedy films
1985 comedy films
1980s English-language films
Films produced by Gilbert Adler
1980s American films